Pyrgiscus crenatus is a species of sea snail, a marine gastropod mollusk in the family Pyramidellidae, the pyrams and their allies.

Taxonomy
There is disagreement regarding whether Pyrgiscus rufus (Philippi, 1836) and Pyrgiscus fulvocinctus are different species (e.g. according to Peñas & Rolán in Gofas et al., 1999; Giannuzzi-Savelli et al., 2014; Høisæter, 2014) or the same species (e.g. van Aartsen, 1981). In the former case it cannot be determined to which of the two species corresponds the earliest name Pyramis crenatus Brown, 1827, which Høisæter treated as a nomen dubium.

Distribution
This marine species occurs in the following locations:
 Belgian Exclusive Economic Zone
 British Isles
 European waters (ERMS scope)
 Irish Exclusive economic Zone
 United Kingdom Exclusive Economic Zone
 Wimereux

References

 Giannuzzi-Savelli R., Pusateri F., Micali, P., Nofroni, I., Bartolini S. (2014). Atlante delle conchiglie marine del Mediterraneo, vol. 5 (Heterobranchia). Edizioni Danaus, Palermo, pp. 1– 111 with 41 unnumbered plates (figs. 1–363), appendix pp. 1–91.

External links
 To Biodiversity Heritage Library (4 publications)
 To CLEMAM
 To Encyclopedia of Life
 To USNM Invertebrate Zoology Mollusca Collection
 To World Register of Marine Species

Pyramidellidae
Gastropods described in 1827